2015 Apatin Open is a darts tournament, which took place in Apatin, Serbia in 2015.

Results

Men

Women

References

Apatin Open darts
Apatin Open darts
Darts in Serbia
Apatin Open darts